The Kaedi Regional Hospital is the largest health facility in the Gorgol Region in southern Mauritania, and one known for its innovative architecture. 

The new hospital (actually a large extension onto an existing concrete structure) involves the use of handfired locally made brick and a design based on a sequence of simple and complex dome structures. The structure was intended to be both to be naturally cool even while letting in significant light from the outdoors. 

The hospital was designed by Fabrizio Carola of ADAUA, the Association for the Development of Traditional African Urbanism and Architecture. ADUA also used the design and construction project to develop and disseminate both a new "urban vernacular" architecture for the region and to train workers in new, low-cost and locally appropriate techniques in construction. Workmen were trained on site in the new techniques 

The hospital won the Aga Khan Award for Architecture in 1995.

Gallery

References

Archnet: Kaedi Regional Hospital

Aga Khan Award

Hospital buildings completed in 1989
Hospitals in Mauritania
Hospitals established in 1989